The Missouri Tigers football program represents the University of Missouri (often referred to as Mizzou) in college football and competes in the Football Bowl Subdivision (FBS) of the National Collegiate Athletic Association (NCAA).

Missouri's football program dates back to 1890, and has appeared in 35 bowl games (including 10 major bowl appearances: four Orange Bowls, three Cotton Bowls, two Sugar Bowls, and one Fiesta Bowl). Missouri has won 15 conference titles and 5 division titles, and has two national-championship selections recognized by the NCAA. Entering the 2021 season, Missouri's all-time record is 701–585–52.

Since 2012, Missouri has been a member of the Southeastern Conference (SEC) and competes in the Eastern Division. Home games are played at Faurot Field ("The Zou") in Columbia, Missouri, named for hall of fame coach Don Faurot.

Hall of famer Gary Pinkel, coach from 2001–2015, has the most wins Missouri football history, setting that mark with his 102nd win at the AT&T Cotton Bowl on January 3, 2014. Pinkel's record with Mizzou after his final game on November 27, 2015, is 118–73.

The team is currently coached by Eliah Drinkwitz.

History

Conference affiliations
 Independent (1890–1892)
 Western Interstate University Football Association (1892–1897)
 Independent (1898–1906)
 Big Eight Conference (1907–1995)
 MVIAA 1907–1964, unofficially called Big Six 1928–1947, Big Seven 1947–1957 and Big Eight 1957–1963
 Big 12 Conference (1996–2011)
 Southeastern Conference (2012–present)

Championships
The Missouri Tigers have 15 conference championships and five conference division titles.

National championships
The Tigers were selected as national champions by NCAA-designated major selectors in 1960 and 2007.

† The 1960 record was 10–1, but was later changed to 11–0 due to Kansas' subsequent forfeit

Conference championships 
Missouri has won 15 conference championships.

† Co-champions
‡ The 1960 Big Eight title was retroactively awarded after a loss to Kansas was reversed due to Kansas' use of a player who was later ruled to be ineligible.

Division championships 
The Tigers were previously members of the Big 12 North division between its inception in 1996 and the dissolution of conference divisions within the Big 12 in 2011. The Tigers joined the SEC as members of the SEC East starting in 2012. Missouri has won five division championships.

† Co-champion

Bowl games
Missouri has appeared in 35 bowl games, including 10 major bowl appearances: 4 Orange Bowls, 3 Cotton Bowls, 2 Sugar Bowls, and 1 Fiesta Bowl, with an all-time bowl record of 15–20. The team also accepted a bid to the 2020 Music City Bowl against Iowa, which was subsequently canceled due to COVID-19.

Missouri's entire bowl history is shown in the table below.

Rivalries

Currently active

Arkansas

Missouri and Arkansas first met in 1906 in Columbia, Missouri, and played each other five times prior to Missouri joining the SEC in 2012, and then becoming Arkansas' permanent cross-division rival in 2014. The annual meeting was dubbed the Battle Line Rivalry. On November 23, 2015, a new rivalry trophy was unveiled for the annual game. Missouri leads the series 10-4 as of the conclusion of the 2022 season, which saw the Tigers win 29-27.

South Carolina

A new rivalry was started in 2012 when Missouri joined the SEC East. With both schools located in cities named Columbia (Columbia, Missouri, and Columbia, South Carolina), the mayors of the cities commemorate the winner with the "Mayor's Cup" trophy for the annual game. Missouri leads the series 8-5 as of the conclusion of the 2022 season.

Historic

Kansas

Missouri leads the series with Kansas 57–54–9 through the 2021 season. With history dating back to Bleeding Kansas in the 1850s, the "Border War" rivalry was well-known as one of the longest-lasting and fiercest rivalries in college sports. The teams met annually, traditionally for the final game of the regular season, from 1891 through 2011 when Missouri left the Big 12 for the SEC.

Illinois

The rivalry between Missouri and Illinois is modeled after the two schools' longstanding basketball rivalry, and it garners the most interest around St. Louis, with both schools having alumni and fans in the area. It has not been played annually, with 24 matchups occurring from 1896 to 2010, with Missouri leading the series 17–7. Between 2000 and 2010, the schools met in St. Louis six times, with Missouri winning each time.  In 2026, the series will be renewed for a four-year period, to be played on campus sites.

Iowa State

Missouri and Iowa State first met in 1896 and the regional rivalry was born. Before the 1959 match-up between the two schools, which took place in Ames, Iowa, field testing showed that the telephones the two schools used to communicate with their coaches in the coaches' box were wired so that either school could hear what was happening on the other sideline. The problem was fixed before the game, but neither of the two coaches knew that. Northwestern Bell Telephone Company of Ames then decided to have a trophy made to commemorate the incident, thus the Telephone Trophy was born. When Missouri left the Big 12 for the SEC, the rivalry was essentially ended.
Missouri leads the series with Iowa State 61–34–9 through the 2022 season.

Oklahoma

Oklahoma leads the series 67–24–5 through the 2021 season. From 1940 through 1974, the teams played for the Tiger-Sooner Peace Pipe trophy.

Nebraska

Nebraska leads the series 65–36–3 through the 2021 season. From 1892 through 2010, the teams played for the Victory Bell trophy.

Award winners
 Amos Alonzo Stagg Award – For Contributions to Football
Don Faurot – 1964
 Walter Camp Coach of the Year Award
Warren Powers – 1978
 Mosi Tatupu Award – Best Special Teams Player
Brock Olivo  – 1997
 John Mackey Award – Best Tight End
Chase Coffman – 2008

Player accomplishments

All-Americans 
Missouri has 37 first-team All-American selections as of 2017, 13 of whom were consensus selections.

 Ed Lindenmeyer, T 1925
 Paul Christman, QB 1939
 Darold Jenkins,† C 1941
 Bob Steuber, RB 1942
 Harold Burnine, DE 1955
 Danny LaRose,† DE 1960
 Ed Blaine, T 1961
 Conrad Hitchler, DE 1962
 Johnny Roland,† DB 1965
 Francis Peay, OT 1965
 Russ Washington, OT 1967
 Roger Wehrli,† DB 1968
 Mike Carroll, OG 1969
 Scott Anderson, C 1973
 John Moseley, DB 1973
 Henry Marshall, WR 1975
 Morris Towns, OT 1976
 Kellen Winslow,† TE 1978
 Bill Whitaker, DB 1980
 Brad Edelman, C 1981
 Jeff Gaylord, DT 1981
 Conrad Goode, OT 1983
 John Clay,† OT 1986
 Devin West, TB 1998
 Rob Riti,† C 1999
 Justin Smith, DE 2000
 Martin Rucker,† TE 2007
 Jeremy Maclin,† AP 2007 & 2008
 Chase Coffman,† TE 2008
 Danario Alexander, WR 2009
 Grant Ressel, K 2009
 Michael Egnew,† TE 2010
 Michael Sam,† DE 2013
 Shane Ray,† DE 2014
 Marcus Murphy, ST 2014
 Kentrell Brothers, LB 2015
 Harrison Mevis, K 2021

† Consensus selection

Retired numbers

Missouri has retired six jersey numbers representing seven players as of 2017.

Hall of Fame

College Football Hall of Fame
Missouri has 13 inductees into the College Football Hall of Fame.

Pro Football Hall of Fame
Two Missouri players have been enshrined in the Pro Football Hall of Fame:

Mascot
Truman the Tiger was introduced as the school's mascot against the Utah State Aggies in 1986, receiving his name from former president Harry S Truman.  Truman has been named the "Nation's Best Mascot" three times since 1986, most recently in 2014.

Homecoming
See 1911 Kansas vs. Missouri football game

The NCAA as well as Jeopardy! and Trivial Pursuit recognize the University of Missouri as the birthplace of Homecoming, an event which became a national tradition in college football. The history of the University of Missouri Homecoming can be traced back to the 1911 Kansas vs. Missouri football game, when the Missouri Tigers faced off against the Kansas Jayhawks in the first installment of the Border War rivalry series. Now the Tigers nearly sell out Faurot Field every October.

Future opponents

Intra-division opponents
Missouri plays the other six SEC East opponents once per season.

Non-division opponents 
Missouri plays Arkansas as a permanent non-division opponent annually and rotates around the West division among the other six schools.

Non-conference opponents 
Announced schedules as of October 27, 2022.

References

External links

 

 
American football teams established in 1890
1890 establishments in Missouri